

Bandy

 October 11–14, 2018: 2018 Bandy World Cup in  Sandviken
 In the final,  Villa Lidköping BK defeated  Sandvikens AIK, 4–1, to win their 1st title.
 October 26–28, 2018: 2018 Bandy World Cup Women in  Kungälv
 In the final,  Record Irkutsk defeated  Västerås SK, 4–2, to win their 4th title.
 November 2–4, 2018: 2018 Bandy World Cup Women's U17 in  Vetlanda
 In the final,  Villa Lidköping BK defeated  Skirö AIK, 4–1.
 November 2–4, 2018: Mini World Cup in  Bollnäs
 Winners:  IK Sirius
 November 22–24, 2018: Veteran World Cup in  Lappeenranta
 Winners:  Yenisey Krasnoyarsk BC, 2nd place: Team FIB, 3rd place:  Murman Murmansk
 January 25–27: 2019 Bandy World Championship Y-19 in  Krasnoyarsk
 In the final,  defeated , 2–1, to win their 9th Bandy World Championship Y-19 title.  took third place and  took fourth place.
 January 26 – February 2: 2019 Bandy World Championship in  Vänersborg
 Division A: In the final,  defeated , 6–5 in overtime, to win their second consecutive and 12th overall Bandy World Championship title. 
  took third place.
  was relegated to Division B.
 Division B: In the final,  defeated , with the score of 9–3.
  took third place.
 Estonia was promoted to Division A.
 February  28 – March 2: Bandy World Championship G-17 in  Varkaus
  defeated , 2–1, to win their fifth consecutive Bandy World Championship G-17 title.
  took third place.
 March 11–17: Youth Bandy World Championship in  Arkhangelsk
  defeated , 4–1, to win their eighth Youth Bandy World Championship (Y17) title.
  took third place.

Bobsleigh & Skeleton

IBSF International events
 January 11 – 13: IBSF European Champiopnships 2019 (Bobsleigh only) in  Schönau am Königsee
 Two-man bobsleigh winners:  (Francesco Friedrich & Martin Grothkopp)
 Four-man bobsleigh winners:  (Johannes Lochner, Marc Rademacher, Christian Rasp, & Florian Bauer)
 Two-women bobsleigh winners:  (Mariama Jamanka & Annika Drazek)
 January 12: IBSF Junior European Championships 2019 (Four-man Bobsleigh only) in  Innsbruck
 Junior Four-man bobsleigh winners:  (Cristian Tentea Mihai, Andrei Alexandru Bugheanu, Nicolae Daroczi Ciprian, & Raul Constantin Dobre) 
 January 18: IBSF European Championships 2019 (Skeleton only) in  Innsbruck
 Skeleton winners:  Martins Dukurs (m) /  Janine Flock (f)
 January 25 & 26: IBSF Junior European Championships 2019 in  Sigulda
 Junior Two-man bobsleigh winners:  (Ralfs Berzins & Davis Springis)
 Junior Two-women bobsleigh winners:  (Alena Osipenko & Aleksandra Iokst)
 Junior Skeleton winners:  Evgeniy Rukosuev (m) /  Yulia Kanakina (f)
 February 2 & 3: IBSF Junior World Championships 2019 in  Schönau am Königsee
 Junior Two-man bobsleigh winners:  (Richard Oelsner & Issam Ammour)
 Junior Four-man bobsleigh winners:  (Richard Oelsner, Costa Laurenz, Issam Ammour, & Eric Strauss)
 Junior Two-women bobsleigh winners:  (Katrin Beierl & Jennifer Jantina Oluumi Desire Onasanya)
 Junior Skeleton winners:  Felix Keisinger (m) /  Anna Fernstaedtová (f)
 February 15: 2019 IBSF Para Bobsleigh European Championships in  St. Moritz
 Winner:  Christopher Stewart
 February 25 – March 10: IBSF World Championships 2019 in  Whistler
 Two-man bobsleigh winners:  (Francesco Friedrich & Thorsten Margis)
 Four-man bobsleigh winners:  (Oskars Ķibermanis, Arvis Vilkaste, Jānis Strenga, & Matīss Miknis)
 Two-women bobsleigh winners:  (Mariama Jamanka & Annika Drazek)
 Skeleton winners:  Martins Dukurs (m) /  Tina Hermann (f)
 Team Competition winners:  (Christopher Grotheer, Anna Köhler, Marc Rademacher, Johannes Lochner, Sophia Griebel, & Lisa Sophie Gericke)
 March 30 & 31: 2019 IBSF Para Bobsleigh World Championship in  Lake Placid
 Para Bobsleigh winner:  Lonnie Bissonnette (2 times)

2018–19 Bobsleigh World Cup & 2018–19 Skeleton World Cup
 December 7 – 9, 2018: B&SWC #1 in  Sigulda
 Two-man bobsleigh #1 winners:  (Francesco Friedrich & Alexander Schueller)
 Two-man bobsleigh #2 winners:   (Francesco Friedrich & Martin Grothkopp)
 Two-women bobsleigh winners:  (Mariama Jamanka & Annika Drazek)
 Skeleton winners:  Nikita Tregubov (m) /  Elena Nikitina (f)
 December 14 – 16, 2018: B&SWC #2 in  Winterberg
 Four-man bobsleigh #1 winners:  (Nico Walther, Paul Krenz, Alexander Rödiger, & Eric Franke)
 Four-man bobsleigh #2 winners:  (Francesco Friedrich, Thorsten Margis, Candy Bauer, & Martin Grothkopp)
 Two-women bobsleigh winners:  (Stephanie Schneider & Ann-Christin Strack)
 Skeleton winners:  Aleksandr Tretyakov (m) /  Jacqueline Lölling (f)
 January 4 – 6: B&SWC #3 in  Altenberg
 Two-man bobsleigh winners:  (Francesco Friedrich & Thorsten Margis)
 Four-man bobsleigh winners:  (Francesco Friedrich, Martin Grothkopp, Thorsten Margis, & Candy Bauer)
 Two-women bobsleigh winners:  (Mariama Jamanka & Annika Drazek)
 Skeleton winners:  Aleksandr Tretyakov (m) /  Elena Nikitina (f)
 January 11 – 13: B&SWC #4 in  Schönau am Königsee
 Two-man bobsleigh winners:  (Francesco Friedrich & Martin Grothkopp)
 Four-man bobsleigh winners:  (Johannes Lochner, Christian Rasp, Marc Rademacher, & Florian Bauer)
 Two-women bobsleigh winners:  (Mariama Jamanka & Annika Drazek)
 January 18 – 20: B&SWC #5 in  Innsbruck
 Two-man bobsleigh winners:  (Francesco Friedrich & Thorsten Margis)
 Four-man bobsleigh winners:  (Francesco Friedrich, Martin Grothkopp, Thorsten Margis, & Alexander Schueller)
 Two-women bobsleigh winners:  (Stephanie Schneider & Ann-Christin Strack)
 Skeleton winners:  Martins Dukurs (m) /  Janine Flock (f)
 January 25 – 27: B&SWC #6 in  St. Moritz
 Two-man bobsleigh winners:  (Francesco Friedrich & Alexander Schueller)
 Four-man bobsleigh winners:  (Francesco Friedrich, Alexander Schueller, Candy Bauer, & Martin Grothkopp)
 Two-women bobsleigh winners:  (Elana Meyers & Lauren Gibbs)
 Skeleton winners:  Yun Sung-bin (m) /  Mirela Rahneva (f)
 February 15 & 16: B&SWC #7 in  Lake Placid
 Two-man bobsleigh winners:  (Francesco Friedrich & Thorsten Margis)
 Four-man bobsleigh winners:  (Justin Kripps, Benjamin Coakwell, Ryan Sommer, & Cameron Stones)
 Two-women bobsleigh winners:  (Elana Meyers & Lake Kwaza)
 Skeleton winners:  Aleksandr Tretyakov (m) /  Elena Nikitina and  Jacqueline Lölling (f; tie)
 February 22 – 24: B&SWC #8 (final) in  Calgary
 Two-man bobsleigh winners:  (Francesco Friedrich & Thorsten Margis)
 Four-man bobsleigh winners:  (Francesco Friedrich, Martin Grothkopp, Candy Bauer, & Thorsten Margis)
 Two-women bobsleigh winners:  (Mariama Jamanka & Annika Drazek)
 Men's Skeleton winners:  Aleksandr Tretyakov (#1) /  Yun Sung-bin (#2)
 Women's Skeleton winners:  Mirela Rahneva (#1) /  Tina Hermann (#2)

2018–19 IBSF Europe Cup
 November 16 & 17, 2018: IEC #1 in  Innsbruck #1
 Men's Skeleton winner:  Fabian Kuechler (2 times)
 Women's Skeleton winner:  Madelaine Smith (2 times)
 November 24, 2018: IEC #2 in  Winterberg #1
 Skeleton winners:  Fabian Kuechler (m) /  Kimberley Murray (f)
 December 6 – 8, 2018: IEC #3 in  Altenberg #1
 Two-man bobsleigh #1 winners:  (Romain Heinrich & Dorian Hauterville)
 Two-man bobsleigh #2 winners:  (Johannes Lochner & Florian Bauer)
 Four-man bobsleigh winners:  (Justin Kripps, Cameron Stones, Ryan Sommer, & Benjamin Coakwell)
 Two-women bobsleigh winners:  (Christine de Bruin & Kristen Bujnowski)
 December 6 & 7, 2018: IEC #4 in  Schönau am Königsee #1
 Men's Skeleton winners:  Fabian Kuechler (#1) /  YAN Wengang (#2)
 Women's Skeleton winners:  Hannah Neise (#1) /  Janine Becker (#2)
 December 12 – 16, 2018: IEC #5 in  Schönau am Königsee #2
 Two-man bobsleigh #1 winners:  (Justin Kripps & Cameron Stones)
 Two-man bobsleigh #2 winners:  (Justin Kripps & Benjamin Coakwell)
 Four-man bobsleigh #1 winners:  (Nicholas Poloniato, Ryan Sommer, Cameron Stones, & Benjamin Coakwell)
 Four-man bobsleigh #2 winners:  (Christoph Hafer, Christian Hammers, David Golling, & Tobias Schneider)
 Two-women bobsleigh #1 winners:  (Christin Senkel & Tamara Seer)
 Two-women bobsleigh #2 winners:  (Alysia Rissling & Kristen Bujnowski)
 January 4 – 6: IEC #6 in  Winterberg #2
 Two-man bobsleigh winners:  (Dennis Pihale & Lukas Frytz)
 Four-man bobsleigh #1 winners:  (Christoph Hafer, Christian Hammers, Tobias Schneider, & Matthias Sommer)
 Four-man bobsleigh #2 winners:  (Christoph Hafer, David Golling, Tobias Schneider, & Matthias Sommer)
 Two-women bobsleigh #1 winners:  (Laura Nolte & Deborah Levi)
 Two-women bobsleigh #2 winners:  (Andreea Grecu & Andreea-Teodora Vlad)
 January 10 – 12: IEC #7 in  Innsbruck #2
 Two-man bobsleigh winners:  (Richard Oelsner & Issam Ammour)
 Four-man bobsleigh #1 winners:  (Patrick Baumgartner, Alex Verginer, Simone Fontana, & Lorenzo Bilotti)
 Four-man bobsleigh #2 winners:  (Jonas Jannusch, Benedikt Hertel, Christian Ebert, & Christian Roeder)
 Four-man bobsleigh #3 winners:  (Patrick Baumgartner, Lorenzo Bilotti, Alex Verginer, & Mattia Variola)
 Two-women bobsleigh winners:  (Kim Kalicki & Kira Lipperheide) (2 times)
 January 11 & 12: IEC #8 in  Altenberg #2
 Men's Skeleton winners:  Dominic Rady (#1) /  Evgeniy Rukosuev (#2)
 Women's Skeleton winner:  Janine Becker (2 times)
 January 25 & 26: IEC #9 (final) in  Sigulda
 Two-man bobsleigh #1 winners:  (Christoph Hafer & Tobias Schneider)
 Two-man bobsleigh #2 winners:  (Christoph Hafer & Christian Hammers)
 Two-women bobsleigh winners:  (Lubov Chernykh & Yulia Belomestnykh)
 Skeleton winners:  Evgeniy Rukosuev (m) /  Janine Becker (f)

2018–19 IBSF Intercontinental Cup
 November 15 & 16, 2018: SIC #1 in  Innsbruck
 Men's Skeleton winners:  Craig Thompson (#1) /  Marcus Wyatt (#2)
 Women's Skeleton winner:  Janine Flock (2 times)
 November 23 & 24, 2018: SIC #2 in  Winterberg
 Men's Skeleton winners:  Jung Seung-gi (#1) /  Kilian Freiherr von Schleinitz (#2)
 Women's Skeleton winner:  Laura Deas (2 times)
 January 18 & 19: SIC #3 in  Park City
 Men's Skeleton winner:  Felix Keisinger (2 times)
 Women's Skeleton winners:  Kelly Curtis (#1) /  Susanne Kreher (#2)
 January 24 & 25: SIC #4 (final) in  Lake Placid
 Men's Skeleton winner:  Felix Keisinger (2 times)
 Women's Skeleton winners:  Ashleigh Fay Pittaway (#1) /  Susanne Kreher (#2)

2018–19 IBSF North American Cup
 November 7 – 10, 2018: INAC #1 in  Whistler
 Two-man bobsleigh #1 winners:  (Justin Kripps & Benjamin Coakwell)
 Two-man bobsleigh #2 winners:  (Justin Kripps & Ryan Sommer)
 Four-man bobsleigh winners:  (Justin Kripps, Ryan Sommer, Cameron Stones, & Benjamin Coakwell) (2 times)
 Two-women bobsleigh #1 winners:  (Julie Johnson & Cynthia Serwaah)
 Two-women bobsleigh #2 winners:  (Elana Meyers & Sylvia Hoffmann)
 Men's Skeleton winners:  Geng Wenqiang (#1) /  Vladyslav Heraskevych (#2)
 Women's Skeleton winners:  Yulia Kanakina (#1) /  Kendall Wesenberg (#2)
 November 19 – 21, 2018: INAC #2 in  Park City
 Two-man bobsleigh winners:  (Rudy Rinaldi & Boris Vain) (2 times)
 Four-man bobsleigh #1 winners:  (Rudy Rinaldi, Steven Borges Mendonaca, Boris Vain, & Thibault Demarthon)
 Four-man bobsleigh #2 winners:  (Dominik Dvořák, Jan Šindelář, Jakub Nosek, & Jaroslav Kopřiva)
 Two-women bobsleigh winners:  (Mica McNeill & Montell Douglas) (2 times)
 Men's Skeleton winner:  Andrew Blaser (2 times)
 Women's Skeleton winners:  Leslie Stratton (#1) /  Kelly Curtis (#2)
 November 30 – December 2, 2018: INAC #3 in  Lake Placid
 Two-man bobsleigh winners:  (Christopher Spring & Darren Lundrigan) (2 times)
 Four-man bobsleigh #1 winners:  (Hunter Church, Sam Moeller, Jamil Muhammed-Ray, & Christopher Walsh)
 Four-man bobsleigh #2 winners:  (Christopher Spring, Darren Lundrigan, Cyrus Gray, & Gabriel Chiasson)
 Two-women bobsleigh #1 winners:  (Mica McNeill & Montell Douglas)
 Two-women bobsleigh #2 winners:  (Mica McNeill & Aleasha Kiddle)
 Men's Skeleton winner:  Andrew Blaser (2 times)
 Women's Skeleton winner:  Sara Roderick (2 times)
 January 10 – 13: INAC #4 (final) in  Calgary
 Two-man bobsleigh #1 winners:  (Geoffery Gadbois & Kristopher Horn)
 Two-man bobsleigh #2 winners:  (Christopher Spring & Neville Wright)
 Four-man bobsleigh #1 winners:  (Geoffery Gadbois, Kristopher Horn, Christopher Walsh, & Sam Moeller)
 Four-man bobsleigh #2 winners:  (Hunter Church, Michael Fogt, Dakota Lynch, & Derek Crittenden)
 Two-women bobsleigh #1 winners:  (Kristi Koplin & Terra Evans)
 Two-women bobsleigh #2 winners:  (Kori Hol & Dawn Edith Richardson-Wilson)
 Men's Skeleton winners:  Craig Thompson (#1) /  Kim Ji-soo (#2) 
 Women's Skeleton winners:  Ashleigh Fay Pittaway (#1) /  Kelly Curtis (#2)

2018–19 IBSF Para Bobsleigh World Cup
 December 14 & 15, 2018: PSWC #1 in  Park City
 Para Bobsleigh winner:  Lonnie Bissonnette (2 times)
 December 21 & 22, 2018: PSWC #2 in  Calgary
 Para Bobsleigh winners:  Andreas Kapfinger (#1) /  Guro Konstanse Fronsdal (#2)
 January 12 & 13: PSWC #3 in  Lillehammer
 Para Bobsleigh winner:  Lonnie Bissonnette (2 times)
 January 19 & 20: PSWC #4 in  Oberhof
 Para Bobsleigh winner:  Arturs Klots (2 times)
 February 14 & 15: PSWC #5 (final) in  St. Moritz
 Para Bobsleigh winners:  Sebastian Westin (#1) /  Christopher Stewart (#2)

2018–19 IBSF Women's Monobob Events
 November 4 & 5, 2018: WME #1 in  Lillehammer
 Winner  Walker Breeana (2 times)
 December 12, 2018: WME #2 in  Schönau am Königsee
 Winner:  Christine de Bruin
 January 10: WME #3 (final) in  Calgary
 Winner:  Melissa Lotholz

Curling

International curling championships
 October 13 – 20, 2018: 2018 World Mixed Curling Championship in  Kelowna
  (Skip: Mike Anderson) defeated  (Skip: Sergio Vez), 6–2, to win Canada's first World Mixed Curling Championship title.
  (Skip: Alexander Eremin) took third place.
 November 3 – 10, 2018: 2018 Pacific-Asia Curling Championships in  Gangneung
 Men:  (Skip: Yuta Matsumura) defeated  (Skip: Zou Qiang), 9–7, to win Japan's fourth Men's Pacific-Asia Curling Championships title.
  (Skip: Kim Soo-hyuk) took third place.
 Women:  (Skip: Kim Min-ji) defeated  (Skip: Satsuki Fujisawa), 12–8, to win South Korea's third consecutive and sixth overall Women's Pacific-Asia Curling Championships title.
  (Skip: Jiang Yilun) took third place.
 November 16 – 18, 2018: 2018 Americas Challenge in  Chaska
 Champions:  (Skip: Rich Ruohonen); Second:  (Skip: Rayad Husain); Third:  (Skip: Marcelo Mello)
 November 16 – 24, 2018: 2018 European Curling Championships in  Tallinn
 Men:  (Skip: Bruce Mouat) defeated  (Skip: Niklas Edin), 9–5, to win Scotland's 13th Men's European Curling Championships title.
  (Skip: Joël Retornaz) took third place.
 Women:  (Skip: Anna Hasselborg) defeated  (Skip: Silvana Tirinzoni), 5–4, to win Sweden's 20th Women's European Curling Championships title.
  (Skip: Daniela Jentsch) took third place.
 February 16 – 23: 2019 World Junior Curling Championships in  Liverpool
 Men:  (Skip: Tyler Tardi) defeated  (Skip: Marco Hösli), 9–4, to win Canada's second consecutive and 20th overall Men's World Junior Curling Championships title.
  (Skip: Ross Whyte) took third place.
 Women:  (Skip: Vlada Rumiantseva) defeated  (Skip: Selena Sturmay), 8–7, to win Russia's third Women's World Junior Curling Championships title.
  (Skip: Raphaela Keiser) took third place.
 March 3 – 10: 2019 World Wheelchair Curling Championship in  Stirling
  (Skip: Wang Haitao) defeated  (Skip: Aileen Neilson), 5–2, to win China's first World Wheelchair Curling Championship title.
  (Skip: CHA Jin-ho) took third place.
 March 16 – 24: 2019 World Women's Curling Championship in  Silkeborg
  (Skip: Silvana Tirinzoni) defeated  (Skip: Anna Hasselborg), 8–7, to win Switzerland's seventh World Women's Curling Championship title.
  (Skip: Kim Min-ji) took third place.
 March 30 – April 7: 2019 World Men's Curling Championship in  Lethbridge
  (Skip: Niklas Edin) defeated  (Skip: Kevin Koe), 7–2, to win Sweden's second consecutive and ninth overall World Men's Curling Championship title.
  (Skip: Peter de Cruz) took third place.
 April 20 – 27: 2019 World Mixed Doubles & Senior Curling Championships in  Stavanger
 Mixed Doubles:  (Anna Hasselborg & Oskar Eriksson) defeated  (Jocelyn Peterman & Brett Gallant), 6–5, to win Sweden's first World Mixed Doubles Curling Championship title.
 The  (Cory Christensen & John Shuster) took third place.
 Senior Men:  (Skip: Bryan Cochrane) defeated  (Skip: David Smith), 7–5, to win Canada's second consecutive and 11th overall Men's World Senior Curling Championships title.
  (Skip: Ulrik Schmidt) took third place.
 Senior Women:  (Skip: Sherry Anderson) defeated  (Skip: Lene Bidstrup), 10–1, to win Canada's third consecutive and 13th overall Women's World Senior Curling Championships title.
  (Skip: Chantal Forrer) took third place.

2018–19 Curling World Cup
 Note: The events that are listed below are all new and are making their debut here.
 September 10 – 16, 2018: 2018–19 Curling World Cup – First Leg in  Suzhou
 Men:  (Skip: Kevin Koe) defeated  (Skip: Steffen Walstad), 6–5, to win the 2018–19 World Cup first leg for men.
 Women:  (Skip: Rachel Homan) defeated  (Skip: Anna Hasselborg), 7–3, to win the 2018–19 World Cup first leg for women.
 Mixed Doubles:  (Laura Walker & Kirk Muyres) defeated  (Sarah Anderson & Korey Dropkin), 7–3, to win the 2018–19 World Cup first leg for the mixed doubles event.
 December 5 – 9, 2018: 2018–19 Curling World Cup – Second Leg in  Omaha
 Men:  (Skip: John Shuster) defeated  (Skip: Niklas Edin), 3–1, to win the 2018–19 World Cup second leg for men.
 Women:  (Skip: Satsuki Fujisawa) defeated  (Skip: Kim Min-ji), 7–6, to win the 2018–19 World Cup second leg for women.
 Mixed Doubles:  (Kristin Skaslien & Magnus Nedregotten) defeated  (Jenny Perret & Martin Rios), 10–5, to win the 2018–19 World Cup second leg for the mixed doubles event.
 January 28 – February 3: 2018–19 Curling World Cup – Third Leg in  Jönköping
 Men:  (Skip: Matt Dunstone) defeated  (Skip: Niklas Edin), 5–4, to win the 2018–19 World Cup third leg for men.
 Women:  (Skip: Kim Min-ji) defeated  (Skip: Anna Hasselborg), 6–4, to win the 2018–19 World Cup third leg for women.
 Mixed Doubles:  (Kadriana Sahaidak & Colton Lott) defeated  (Kristin Skaslien & Thomas Ulsrud), 7–5, to win the 2018–19 World Cup third leg for the mixed doubles event.
 May 8 – 12: 2018–19 Curling World Cup – Grand Final in  Beijing
 Men:  (Skip: Kevin Koe) defeated  (Skip: Zou Qiang), 5–3, to win the 2018–19 World Cup Grand Final for men.
 Women:  (Skip: Jennifer Jones) defeated  (Skip: Silvana Tirinzoni), 9–6, to win the 2018–19 World Cup Grand Final for women.
 Mixed Doubles:  (Kristin Skaslien & Magnus Nedregotten) defeated  (Laura Walker & Kirk Muyres), 8–3, to win the 2018–19 World Cup Grand Final for the mixed doubles event.

2018–19 World Curling Tour and Grand Slam of Curling
 August 2, 2018 – April 28, 2019: 2018–19 World Curling Tour and Grand Slam of Curling Seasons
 September 26 – 30, 2018: 2018 Elite 10 (September) in  Chatham-Kent
 Men:  Team Brad Gushue defeated  (Team Reid Carruthers), 2–1, to win their second Men's Elite 10 title.
 Women:  Team Anna Hasselborg defeated  Team Silvana Tirinzoni, 4–0, to win the inaugural Women's Elite 10 title.
 October 23 – 28, 2018: 2018 Masters in  Truro
 Men:  Team John Epping defeated  Team Kevin Koe, 7–4, to win their first Men's Masters title.
 Women:  Team Anna Hasselborg defeated  Team Rachel Homan, 8–7, to win their first Women's Masters title.
 Note: Team Hasselborg was the first non-Canadian one to win the women's Masters event.
 November 6 – 11, 2018: 2018 Tour Challenge in  Thunder Bay
 Men:  Team Brad Jacobs) defeated  Team Brendan Bottcher, 6–5, to win their first Men's Tour Challenge title.
 Women:  Team Rachel Homan defeated  Team Tracy Fleury, 8–4, to win their first Women's Tour Challenge title.
 December 11 – 16, 2018: 2018 National in  Conception Bay South
 Men:  Team Ross Paterson) defeated fellow Scottish team (Skip: Bruce Mouat), 4–3, to win their first Men's National title.
 Women:  Team Rachel Homan defeated  Team Kerri Einarson, 4–1, to win their second Women's National title.
 January 8 – 13: 2019 Canadian Open in  North Battleford
 Men:  Team Brendan Bottcher defeated  Team John Epping, 6–3, to win their first Men's Canadian Open title.
 Women:  Team Rachel Homan defeated  Team Silvana Tirinzoni, 4–3, to win their second Women's Canadian Open title.
 April 9 – 14: 2019 Players' Championship in  Toronto
 Men:  Team Brendan Bottcher defeated  Team Kevin Koe, 6–1, to win Alberta's second consecutive and 14th overall Men's Players' Championship title.
 Women:  Team Kerri Einarson defeated  Team Anna Hasselborg, 5–4, to win Manitoba's seventh Women's Players' Championship title.
 April 23 – 28: 2019 Champions Cup in  Saskatoon
 Men:  Team Brendan Bottcher defeated  Team Kevin Koe, 6–5, to win Alberta's first Men's Champions Cup & third consecutive Grand Slam title.
 Women:  Team Silvana Tirinzoni defeated  Team Kerri Einarson, 6–3, to win Switzerland's first Women's Champions Cup title.

Curling Canada Season of Champions events
 December 5–9, 2018: 2018 Canada Cup in  Estevan
Men:  Team Brad Jacobs defeated  Team Kevin Koe, 5–4, to win Ontario's second Men's Canada Cup title.
Women:  Team Jennifer Jones defeated  Team Kerri Einarson, 8–5, to win Manitoba's second consecutive and fifth overall Women's Canada Cup title.
January 17–20: 2019 Continental Cup in  Paradise, Nevada
 Team World defeated / Team North America, 34–26 points, to win their fifth Continental Cup title.
January 19–27: 2019 Canadian Junior Curling Championships in  Prince Albert
Men:  Team Tyler Tardi defeated  Team J.T. Ryan, 7–5, to win British Columbia's third consecutive and seventh overall Men's Canadian Junior Curling Championships title.
Women:  Team Selena Sturmay defeated  Team Sarah Daniels, 9–6, to win Alberta's tenth Women's Canadian Junior Curling Championships title.
February 16–24: 2019 Scotties Tournament of Hearts in  Sydney
Women:  Team Chelsea Carey defeated  Team Rachel Homan, 8–6, to win Alberta's fourth Scotties Tournament of Hearts title.
March 2–10: 2019 Tim Hortons Brier in  Brandon
Men:  Team Kevin Koe defeated  Team Brendan Bottcher (wildcard), 4–3, to win Alberta's 28th Tim Hortons Brier title.

Figure skating

International figure skating events
 January 21 – 27: 2019 European Figure Skating Championships in  Minsk
 Men's winner:  Javier Fernández
 Ladies' winner:  Sofia Samodurova
 Pairs winners:  (Vanessa James & Morgan Ciprès)
 Ice Dance winners:  (Gabriella Papadakis & Guillaume Cizeron)
 February 4 – 10: 2019 Four Continents Figure Skating Championships in  Anaheim, California
 Men's winner:  Shoma Uno
 Ladies' winner:  Rika Kihira
 Pairs winners:  (Sui Wenjing & Han Cong)
 Ice Dance winners:  (Madison Chock & Evan Bates)
 March 4 – 10: 2019 World Junior Figure Skating Championships in  Zagreb
 Men's winner:  Tomoki Hiwatashi
 Ladies' winner:  Alexandra Trusova
 Pairs winners:  (Anastasia Mishina & Aleksandr Galliamov)
 Ice Dance winners:  (Marjorie Lajoie & Zachary Lagha)
 March 18 – 24: 2019 World Figure Skating Championships in  Saitama
 Men's winner:  Nathan Chen
 Ladies' winner:  Alina Zagitova
 Pairs winners:  (Sui Wenjing & Han Cong)
 Ice Dance winners:  (Gabriella Papadakis & Guillaume Cizeron)

2018–19 ISU Grand Prix of Figure Skating
 October 19 – 21: 2018 Skate America in  Everett, Washington
 Men's winner:  Nathan Chen
 Ladies' winner:  Satoko Miyahara
 Pairs winners:  (Evgenia Tarasova & Vladimir Morozov)
 Ice Dance winners:  (Madison Hubbell & Zachary Donohue)
 October 26 – 28: 2018 Skate Canada International in  Laval, Quebec
 Men's winner:  Shoma Uno
 Ladies' winner:  Elizaveta Tuktamysheva
 Pairs winners:  (Vanessa James & Morgan Ciprès)
 Ice Dance winners:  (Madison Hubbell & Zachary Donohue)
 November 2 – 4: 2018 Grand Prix of Figure Skating #3 in  Helsinki
 Men's winner:  Yuzuru Hanyu
 Ladies' winner:  Alina Zagitova
 Pairs winners:  (Natalya Zabiyako & Alexander Enbert)
 Ice Dance winners:  (Alexandra Stepanova & Ivan Bukin)
 November 9 – 11: 2018 NHK Trophy in  Hiroshima
 Men's winner:  Shoma Uno
 Ladies' winner:  Rika Kihira
 Pairs winners:  (Natalya Zabiyako & Alexander Enbert)
 Ice Dance winners:  (Kaitlin Hawayek & Jean-Luc Baker)
 November 16 – 18: 2018 Rostelecom Cup in  Moscow
 Men's winner:  Yuzuru Hanyu
 Ladies' winner:  Alina Zagitova
 Pairs winners:  (Evgenia Tarasova & Vladimir Morozov)
 Ice Dance winners:  (Alexandra Stepanova & Ivan Bukin)
 November 23 – 25: 2018 Internationaux de France in  Grenoble
 Men's winner:  Nathan Chen
 Ladies' winner:  Rika Kihira
 Pairs winners:  (Vanessa James & Morgan Ciprès)
 Ice Dance winners:  (Gabriella Papadakis & Guillaume Cizeron)
 December 6 – 9: 2018–19 Grand Prix of Figure Skating Final in  Vancouver 
 Men's winner:  Nathan Chen
 Ladies' winner:  Rika Kihira
 Pairs winners:  (Vanessa James & Morgan Ciprès)
 Ice Dance winners:  (Madison Hubbell & Zachary Donohue)

2018–19 ISU Junior Grand Prix of Figure Skating
 August 22 – 25: JGP #1 in  Bratislava
 Junior Men's winner:  Stephen Gogolev
 Junior Ladies' winner:  Anna Shcherbakova
 Junior Pairs winners:  (Anastasia Mishina & Aleksandr Galiamov)
 Junior Ice Dance winners:  (Elizaveta Khudaiberdieva & Nikita Nazarov)
 August 29 – September 1: JGP #2 in  Linz
 Junior Men's winner:  Camden Pulkinen
 Junior Ladies' winner:  Alena Kostornaia
 Junior Pairs winners:  (Polina Kostiukovich & Dmitrii Ialin)
 Junior Ice Dance winners:  (Sofia Shevchenko & Igor Eremenko)
 September 5 – 8: JGP #3 in  Kaunas
 Note: There was no junior pairs event here.
 Junior Men's winner:  Andrew Torgashev
 Junior Ladies' winner:  Alexandra Trusova
 Junior Ice Dance winners:  (Arina Ushakova & Maxim Nekrasov)
 September 12 – 15: JGP #4 in  Richmond
 Junior Men's winner:  Petr Gumennik
 Junior Ladies' winner:  Anna Shcherbakova
 Junior Pairs winners:  (Anastasia Mishina & Aleksandr Galiamov)
 Junior Ice Dance winners:  (Marjorie Lajoie & Zachary Lagha)
 September 26 – 29: JGP #5 in  Ostrava
 Junior Men's winner:  Andrei Mozalev
 Junior Ladies' winner:  Alena Kostornaia
 Junior Pairs winners:  (Kseniia Akhanteva & Valerii Kolesov)
 Junior Ice Dance winners:  (Elizaveta Khudaiberdieva & Nikita Nazarov)
 October 3 – 6: JGP #6 in  Ljubljana
 Note: There was no junior pairs event here.
 Junior Men's winner:  Petr Gumennik
 Junior Ladies' winner:  Anastasia Tarakanova
 Junior Ice Dance winners:  (Avonley Nguyen & Vadym Kolesnik)
 October 10 – 13: JGP #7 in  Yerevan
 Note: There was no junior pairs event here.
 Junior Men's winner:  Adam Siao-Him Fa
 Junior Ladies' winner:  Alexandra Trusova
 Junior Ice Dance winners:  (Arina Ushakova & Maxim Nekrasov)
 December 6 – 9: 2018–19 Grand Prix of Figure Skating Final in  Vancouver
 Junior Men's winner:  Stephen Gogolev
 Junior Ladies' winner:  Alena Kostornaia
 Junior Pairs winners:  (Anastasia Mishina & Aleksandr Galiamov)
 Junior Ice Dance winners:  (Sofia Shevchenko & Igor Eremenko)

Ice hockey

Main world ice hockey championships
 December 26, 2018 – January 5, 2019: 2019 World Junior Ice Hockey Championships in  Vancouver & Victoria
  took third place.
 January 6 – 13: 2019 IIHF World Women's U18 Championship in  Obihiro
  took third place.
 April 4 – 14: 2019 IIHF Women's World Championship in  Espoo
 The  defeated , 2–1 in a shootout, to win their fifth consecutive and ninth overall IIHF Women's World Championship title.
  took third place. 
 Note: This was the first IIHF Women's World Championship final that was not a Canada–USA matchup.
 April 18 – 28: 2019 IIHF World U18 Championships in  Örnsköldsvik & Umeå
  defeated , 4–3 in overtime, to win their first IIHF World U18 Championship title.
  took third place.
 May 10 – 26: 2019 IIHF World Championship in  Bratislava and Košice
  defeated , 3–1, to win their third IIHF World Championship title.
  took third place.

2019 world ice hockey divisions
 December 8, 2018 – May 5, 2019: 2019 IIHF World Ice Hockey Divisions

2019 IIHF Ice Hockey World Championships
 March 31 – April 6: Division III Qualification in  Abu Dhabi
 Final Round Robin Ranking: 1. , 2. , 3. , 4. , 5. , 6. 
 The United Arab Emirates was promoted to Division III for 2020.
 April 9 – 15: Division II – Group A in  Belgrade
 Final Round Robin Ranking: 1. , 2. , 3. , 4. , 5. , 6. 
 Serbia was promoted to Division I – Group B for 2020. Belgium was relegated to Division II – Group B for 2020.
 April 21 – 27: Division II – Group B in  Mexico City
 Final Round Robin Ranking: 1. , 2. , 3. , 4. , 5. , 6. 
 Israel was promoted to Division II – Group A for 2020. North Korea was relegated to Division III for 2020.
 April 22 – 28: Division III in  Sofia
 Final Round Robin Ranking: 1. , 2. , 3. , 4. , 5. , 6. 
 Bulgaria was promoted to Division II – Group B for 2020. South Africa was relegated to Division III Qualification for 2020.
 April 28 – May 4: Division I – Group B in  Tallinn
 Final Round Robin Ranking: 1. , 2. , 3. , 4. , 5. , 6. 
 Romania was promoted to Division I – Group A for 2020. The Netherlands was relegated to Division II – Group A for 2020.
 April 29 – May 5: Division I – Group A in  Astana
 Final Round Robin Ranking: 1. , 2. , 3. , 4. , 5. , 6. 
 Both Kazakhstan and Belarus was promoted to Top Division for 2020. Lithuania was relegated to Division I – Group B for 2020.

2019 IIHF World U20 Championship (Junior)
 December 8 – 14, 2018: Division I – Group B in  Tychy
 Final Round Robin Ranking: 1. , 2. , 3. , 4. , 5. , 6. 
 Slovenia was promoted to Division I – Group A for 2020. Japan was relegated to Division II – Group A for 2020.
 December 9 – 15, 2018: Division I – Group A in  Füssen
 Final Round Robin Ranking: 1. , 2. , 3. , 4. , 5. , 6. 
 Germany was promoted to Top Division for 2020. France was relegated to Division I – Group B for 2020.
 January 13 – 19: Division II – Group A in  Tallinn
 Final Round Robin Ranking: 1. , 2. , 3. , 4. , 5. , 6. 
 Estonia was promoted to Division I – Group B for 2020. South Korea was relegated to Division II – Group B for 2020.
 January 14 – 20: Division III in  Reykjavík
 Final Round Robin Ranking: 1. , 2. , 3. , 4. , 5. , 6. , 7. , 8. 
 China was promoted to Division II – Group B for 2020.
 January 15 – 21: Division II – Group B in  Zagreb
 Final Round Robin Ranking: 1. , 2. , 3. , 4. , 5. , 6. 
 Serbia was promoted to Division II – Group A for 2020. Mexico was relegated to Division III for 2020.

2019 IIHF World U18 Championships
 March 25 – 31: Division II – Group B in  Belgrade
 Final Round Robin Ranking: 1. , 2. , 3. , 4. , 5. , 6. 
 Serbia was promoted to Division II – Group A for 2020. Belgium was relegated to Division III – Group A for 2020.
 March 25 – 31: Division III – Group A in  Sofia
 Final Round Robin Ranking: 1. , 2. , 3. , 4. , 5. , 6. 
 Bulgaria was promoted to Division II – Group B for 2020. New Zealand was relegated to Division III – Group B for 2020.
 April 7 – 13: Division II – Group A in  Elektrėnai
 Final Round Robin Ranking: 1. , 2. , 3. , 4. , 5. , 6. 
 Poland was promoted to Division I – Group B for 2020. Spain was relegated to Division II – Group B for 2020.
 April 9 – 12: Division III – Group B in  Cape Town
 Final Round Robin Ranking: 1. , 2. , 3. , 4. 
 Chinese Taipei was promoted to Division III – Group A for 2020.
 April 14 – 20: Division I – Group A in  Grenoble
 Final Round Robin Ranking: 1. , 2. , 3. , 4. , 5. , 6. 
 Germany was promoted to Top Division for 2020. Ukraine was relegated to Division I – Group B for 2020.
 April 14 – 20: Division I – Group B in  Székesfehérvár
 Final Round Robin Ranking: 1. , 2. , 3. , 4. , 5. , 6. 
 Japan was promoted to Division I – Group A for 2020. Great Britain was relegated to Division II – Group A for 2020.

2019 IIHF Women's World Championship
 January 13 – 18: Division II – Group B Qualification in  Cape Town
 Final Round Robin Ranking: 1. , 2. , 3. , 4. , 5. 
 Ukraine was promoted to Division II – Group B for 2020.
 April 1 – 7: Division II – Group B in  Brașov
 Final Round Robin Ranking: 1. , 2. , 3. , 4. , 5. , 6. 
 Chinese Taipei was promoted to Division II – Group A for 2020. Romania was relegated to Division II – Group B Qualification for 2020.
 April 2 – 8: Division II – Group A in  Dumfries
 Final Round Robin Ranking: 1. , 2. , 3. , 4. , 5. , 6. 
 Slovenia was promoted to Division I – Group B for 2020. Australia was relegated to Division II – Group B for 2020.
 April 6 – 12: Division I – Group B in  Beijing
 Final Round Robin Ranking: 1. , 2. , 3. , 4. , 5. , 6. 
 The Netherlands was promoted to Division I – Group A for 2020. Latvia was relegated to Division II – Group A for 2020.
 April 7 – 13: Division I – Group A in  Budapest
 Final Round Robin Ranking: 1. , 2. , 3. , 4. , 5. , 6. 
 Hungary and Denmark were promoted to Top Division for 2020. Italy was relegated to Division I – Group B for 2020.

2019 IIHF World Women's U18 Championship
 January 6 – 12: Division I – Group B in  Dumfries
 Final Round Robin Ranking: 1. , 2. , 3. , 4. , 5. , 6. 
 France was promoted to Division I – Group A for 2020. The Netherlands was relegated to Division I – Group B Qualification for 2020.
 January 7 – 13: Division I – Group A in  Radenthein
 Final Round Robin Ranking: 1. , 2. , 3. , 4. , 5. , 6. 
 Slovakia was promoted to Top Division for 2020. Austria was relegated to Division I – Group B for 2020.
 January 12 – 18: Division I – Group B Qualification in  Jaca
 Final Round Robin Ranking: 1. , 2. , 3. , 4. , 5. , 6. , 7. 
 South Korea was promoted to Division I – Group B for 2020.

National Hockey League
 October 3, 2018 – April 6, 2019: 2018–19 NHL season
 Presidents' Trophy and Eastern Conference winners:  Tampa Bay Lightning
 Western Conference winners:  Calgary Flames
 Art Ross Trophy winner:  Nikita Kucherov ( Tampa Bay Lightning)
 January 1: 2019 NHL Winter Classic at Notre Dame Stadium in  Notre Dame
 The  Boston Bruins defeated the  Chicago Blackhawks, with the score of 4–2.
 January 26: 2019 National Hockey League All-Star Game at SAP Center in  San Jose
 All-Star Game: Team Metropolitan defeated Team Central 10–5.
 All-Star Game MVP:  Sidney Crosby ( Pittsburgh Penguins)
 Fastest skater:  Connor McDavid ( Edmonton Oilers)
 Puck control:  Johnny Gaudreau ( Calgary Flames)
 Save streak:  Henrik Lundqvist ( New York Rangers)
 Premier passer:  Leon Draisaitl ( Edmonton Oilers)
 Hardest shot:  John Carlson ( Washington Capitals)
 Accuracy shooting:  David Pastrňák ( Boston Bruins)
 February 23: 2019 NHL Stadium Series at Lincoln Financial Field in  Philadelphia
 The  Philadelphia Flyers defeated the  Pittsburgh Penguins, with the score of 4–3 in overtime.
 April 10 – June 12: 2019 Stanley Cup playoffs
 The  St. Louis Blues defeated the  Boston Bruins, 4–3 in games played, to win their first Stanley Cup championship.
 June 21 & 22: 2019 NHL Entry Draft at Rogers Arena in  Vancouver
 #1:  Jack Hughes (to the  New Jersey Devils from the  U.S. NTDP)

Kontinental Hockey League
 September 1, 2018 – April 19, 2019: 2018–19 KHL season
  CSKA swept fellow Russian team, Avangard, 4–0 in the best-of-seven final series to win their first Gagarin Cup title.

North America (ice hockey)

United States (AHL/ECHL/USHL)
 October 5, 2018 – April 15: 2018–19 AHL season
 Macgregor Kilpatrick Trophy & Atlantic Division winners:  Charlotte Checkers
 North Division winners:  Syracuse Crunch
 Central Division winners:  Chicago Wolves
 Pacific Division winners:  Bakersfield Condors
 April 17 – June 8: 2019 Calder Cup playoffs
 The  Charlotte Checkers defeated the  Chicago Wolves, 4–1 in games played (out of 7), to win their first Calder Cup title.
 October 5, 2018 – April 13: 2018–19 USHL season
 Anderson Cup & Western Conference winners:  Tri-City Storm
 Eastern Conference winners:  Muskegon Lumberjacks
 April 15 – May 17: 2019 Clark Cup playoffs
 The  Sioux Falls Stampede defeated the  Chicago Steel, 3–0 in games played (out of 5), to win their third Clark Cup title. 
 October 12, 2018 – April 7: 2018–19 ECHL season
 Brabham Cup & Central Division winners:  Cincinnati Cyclones
 North Division winners:  Newfoundland Growlers
 South Division winners:  Florida Everblades
 Mountain Division winners:  Tulsa Oilers
 April 11 – June 4: 2019 Kelly Cup playoffs
 The  Newfoundland Growlers defeated the  Toledo Walleye, 4–2 in games played (out of 7), to win their first Kelly Cup title.

Junior (OHL/QMJHL/WHL)
 September 19, 2018 – March 17, 2019: 2018–19 OHL season
 Hamilton Spectator Trophy & East Division winners:  Ottawa 67's
 Central Division:  Niagara IceDogs
 Midwest Division:  London Knights
 West Division:  Saginaw Spirit
 September 20, 2018 – March 16, 2019: 2018–19 QMJHL season
 Jean Rougeau Trophy & West Division winners:  Rouyn-Noranda Huskies
 Maritimes Division:  Halifax Mooseheads
 East Division:  Baie-Comeau Drakkar
 Central Division:  Drummondville Voltigeurs
 September 21, 2018 – March 17, 2019: 2018–19 WHL season
 Scotty Munro Memorial Trophy & East Division winners:  Prince Albert Raiders
 Central Division:  Edmonton Oil Kings
 U.S. Division:  Everett Silvertips
 B.C. Division:  Vancouver Giants
 May 17 – 26: 2019 Memorial Cup at Scotiabank Centre in  Halifax
 The  Rouyn-Noranda Huskies defeated the  Halifax Mooseheads, 4–2, to win their first Memorial Cup title.

College (USA–NCAA–Division I)
 March 16 – 24: 2019 NCAA National Collegiate Women's Ice Hockey Tournament (Frozen Four at People's United Center in  Hamden)
 The  Wisconsin Badgers defeated the  Minnesota Golden Gophers 2–0 to win their fifth NCAA National Collegiate Women's Ice Hockey title.
 March 29 – April 13: 2019 NCAA Division I Men's Ice Hockey Tournament (Frozen Four at KeyBank Center in  Buffalo)
 The  Minnesota–Duluth Bulldogs defeated the  UMass Minutemen 3–0 to win their second consecutive and third overall NCAA Division I Men's Ice Hockey title.

Women (CWHL/NWHL)
 October 6, 2018 – March 3, 2019: 2018–19 NWHL season
 Regular season winners:  Minnesota Whitecaps
 March 6 – 17: 2019 Isobel Cup Playoffs
 The  Minnesota Whitecaps defeated the  Buffalo Beauts, 2–1 in overtime, to win their first Isobel Cup title.
 March 24: 2019 Clarkson Cup in  Toronto
 The  Calgary Inferno defeated the  Les Canadiennes de Montréal, 5–2, to win their second Clarkson Cup title.

Senior
 April 8 – 13: 2019 Allan Cup in  Lacombe, Alberta
 The  Lacombe Generals defeated fellow Albertan team, the Innisfail Eagles, 5–2, to win their first Allan Cup title.

Europe (ice hockey)
 August 30, 2018 – February 5, 2019: 2018–19 Champions Hockey League
  Frölunda HC defeated  EHC Red Bull München, 3–1, to win their third Champions Hockey League title.
  HC Plzen and  EC Red Bull Salzburg finished in joint third place, as the losing semi-finalists.
 September 28, 2018 – January 13, 2019: 2018–19 IIHF Continental Cup
 Final Ranking: 1.  Arlan Kokshetau, 2.  Belfast Giants, 3.  GKS Katowice, 4.  HK Gomel

Asia (ice hockey)
 September 1, 2018 – February 2, 2019: 2018–19 Asia League Ice Hockey season
 Note: The top 5 ice hockey teams named below would get to play in the playoffs.
 1st Place:  Daemyung Killer Whales; 2nd Place:  Sakhalin; Third:  Anyang Halla; Fourth:  Nippon Paper Cranes; Fifth:  Oji Eagles
 February 16 – March 17: 2018–19 Asia League Ice Hockey Playoffs
  Sakhalin defeated  Nippon Paper Cranes, in order to win their first Asia League Ice Hockey title.
 December 3 – 6, 2018: 2019 IIHF Ice Hockey U20 Challenge Cup of Asia Division I in  Kuala Lumpur
 Final Round Robin Ranking: 1. , 2. , 3. , 4. 
 December 6 – 8, 2018: 2019 IIHF U20 Challenge Cup of Asia in  Kuala Lumpur
 Final Round Robin Ranking: 1. , 2. , 3. , 4. 
 March 1 – 9: 2019 IIHF Challenge Cup of Asia in  Kuala Lumpur
 Final Ranking: 1. , 2. , 3. , 4. , 5. , 6. , 7. 
 Mongolia defeated the Philippines, 6–3, to win their second consecutive IIHF Challenge Cup of Asia title.
 Singapore took third place.
 April 14 – 19: 2019 IIHF Women's Challenge Cup of Asia in  Abu Dhabi
 Final Round Robin Ranking: 1. , 2. , 3. , 4. , 5. 
 April 14 – 19: 2019 IIHF Women's Challenge Cup of Asia Division I in  Abu Dhabi
 Final Round Robin Ranking: 1. , 2. , 3. , 4.

Other ice hockey tournaments
 November 9 – 11, 2018: 2018 LATAM Cup in  Coral Springs
 Final Ranking: 1. , 2.  Mexico Selects, 3. , 4. , 5. 
 Colombia defeated Mexico Selects, 12–3, to win their first LATAM Cup title.
 November 19 – 21, 2018: 2018 Development Cup in  Füssen
 Final Ranking: 1. , 2. , 3. , 4. 
 Macedonia defeated Portugal, 9–3, to win their first Development Cup title.

Luge

International luge events
 December 14 & 15, 2018: 2018 Junior America-Pacific Luge Championships in  Calgary
 Note: There was no junior men's doubles event here.
 Junior Men's singles:  Sean Hollander 
 Junior Women's singles:  Sam Judson 
 December 15 & 16, 2018: 2018 America-Pacific Luge Championships in  Lake Placid
 Men's singles:  Chris Mazdzer
 Women's singles:  Emily Sweeney
 Men's doubles:  (Tristan Walker & Justin Snith)
 January 17 – 19: FIL Junior European Luge Championships 2019 in  St. Moritz
 Junior Men's singles:  David Noessler
 Junior Women's singles:  Verena Hofer 
 Junior Men's doubles:  (Hannes Orlamuender & Paul Constantin Gubitz)
 January 25 – 27: 2019 FIL World Luge Championships in  Winterberg
 Men's singles:  Felix Loch
 Women's singles:  Natalie Geisenberger
 Men's doubles:  (Toni Eggert & Sascha Benecken)
 January 31 – February 3: FIL World Luge Natural Track Championships 2019 in  Latzfons
 Men's singles:  Alex Gruber
 Women's singles:  Evelin Lanthaler
 Men's doubles:  (Patrick Pigneter & Florian Clara)
 February 1 & 2: FIL Junior World Luge Championships 2019 in  Innsbruck
 Junior Men's singles:  Max Langenhan
 Junior Women's singles:  Cheyenne Rosenthal
 Junior Men's doubles:  (Hannes Orlamuender & Paul Constantin Gubitz)
 February 9 & 10: 2019 FIL European Luge Championships in  Oberhof
 Men's singles:  Semen Pavlichenko
 Women's singles:  Natalie Geisenberger
 Men's doubles:  (Tobias Wendl & Tobias Arlt)
 February 22 – 24: FIL Junior European Luge Championships 2019 in  Umhausen
 Men's singles:  Fabian Achenrainer
 Women's singles:  Daniela Mittermair
 Men's doubles:  (Fabian Achenrainer & Miguel Brugger)

2018–19 Luge World Cup
 November 24 & 25, 2018: LWC #1 in  Innsbruck
 Men's singles:  Johannes Ludwig
 Women's singles:  Natalie Geisenberger
 Men's doubles:  (Thomas Steu & Lorenz Koller)
 November 30 & December 1, 2018: LWC #2 in  Whistler
 Men's singles:  Wolfgang Kindl
 Women's singles:  Natalie Geisenberger
 Men's doubles:  (Toni Eggert & Sascha Benecken)
 December 7 & 8, 2018: LWC #3 in  Calgary
 Men's singles:  Wolfgang Kindl
 Women's singles:  Julia Taubitz 
 Men's doubles:  (Tobias Wendl & Tobias Arlt)
 December 15 & 16, 2018: LWC #4 in  Lake Placid
 Men's singles:  Roman Repilov
 Women's singles:  Dajana Eitberger
 Men's doubles:  (Toni Eggert & Sascha Benecken)
 January 5 & 6: LWC #5 in  Berchtesgaden-Königssee
 Men's singles:  Reinhard Egger
 Women's singles:  Julia Taubitz
 Men's doubles:  (Toni Eggert & Sascha Benecken)
 January 12 & 13: LWC #6 in  Sigulda
 Men's singles:  Semen Pavlichenko
 Women's singles:  Tatiana Ivanova
 Men's doubles:  (Toni Eggert & Sascha Benecken)
 February 2 & 3: LWC #7 in  Altenberg
 Men's singles:  Felix Loch
 Women's singles:  Sandra Robatscher
 Men's doubles:  (Thomas Steu & Lorenz Koller)
 February 9 & 10: LWC #8 in  Oberhof
 Men's singles:  Semen Pavlichenko
 Women's singles:  Natalie Geisenberger
 Men's doubles:  (Tobias Wendl & Tobias Arlt)
 February 23 & 24: LWC #9 (final) in  Sochi
 Men's singles:  Semen Pavlichenko
 Women's singles:  Natalie Geisenberger
 Men's doubles:  (Alexander Denisyev & Vladislav Antonov)

2018–19 Team Relay Luge World Cup
 November 30 & December 1, 2018: TRLWC #1 in  Whistler
 Winners:  (Tatiana Ivanova, Semen Pavlichenko, & Vsevolod Kashkin and Konstatin Korshunov)
 December 7 & 8, 2018: TRLWC #2 in  Calgary
 Winners:  (Julia Taubitz, Felix Loch, & Tobias Wendl and Tobias Arlt)
 January 5 & 6: TRLWC #3 in  Berchtesgaden-Königssee
 Winners:  (Julia Taubitz, Sebastian Bley, & Toni Eggert and Sascha Benecken)
 January 12 & 13: TRLWC #4 in  Sigulda
 Winners:  (Kendija Aparjode, Kristers Aparjods, & Oskars Gudramovičs and Pēteris Kalniņš)
 February 9 & 10: TRLWC #5 in  Oberhof
 Winners:  (Andrea Vötter, Dominik Fischnaller, & Ivan Nagler and Fabian Malleier)
 February 24: TRLWC #6 (final) in  Sochi
 Winners:  (Viktoriia Demchenko, Semen Pavlichenko, & Alexander Denisyev and Vladislav Antonov)

2018–19 Sprint Luge World Cup
 November 24 & 25, 2018: SLWC #1 in  Innsbruck
 Men's singles:  Wolfgang Kindl
 Women's singles:  Natalie Geisenberger
 Men's doubles:  (Thomas Steu & Lorenz Koller)
 December 15 & 16, 2018: SLWC #2 in  Lake Placid
 Men's singles:  Roman Repilov
 Women's singles:  Natalie Geisenberger
 Men's doubles:  (Toni Eggert & Sascha Benecken)
 February 23 & 24: SLWC #3 (final) in  Sochi
 Men's singles:  Semen Pavlichenko
 Women's singles:  Viktoriia Demchenko
 Men's doubles:  (Alexander Denisyev & Vladislav Antonov)

2018–19 Natural Track Luge World Cup
 December 15 & 16, 2018: NTLWC #1 in  Kühtai
 Men's singles:  Alex Gruber
 Women's singles:  Evelin Lanthaler
 Men's doubles:  (Rupert Brueggler & Tobias Angerer)
 Team:  (Evelin Lanthaler, Florian Clara, & Alex Gruber)
 January 10 – 12: NTLWC #2 in  Obdach-Winterleiten
 Men's singles:  Thomas Kammerlander
 Women's singles:  Evelin Lanthaler
 Men's doubles:  (Patrick Pigneter & Florian Clara)
 Team:  (Tina Unterberger, Michael Scheikl, & Thomas Kammerlander)
 January 18 – 20: NTLWC #3 in  Moscow
 Men's singles:  Alex Gruber
 Women's singles:  Evelin Lanthaler
 Men's doubles:  (Patrick Pigneter & Florian Clara)
 January 25 – 27: NTLWC #4 in  Deutschnofen
 Men's singles:  Alex Gruber
 Women's singles:  Evelin Lanthaler
 Men's doubles:  (Patrick Pigneter & Florian Clara)
 Team:  (Evelin Lanthaler, Patrick Pigneter, & Alex Gruber)
 February 8 – 10: NTLWC #5 in  Vatra Dornei
 Men's singles:  Thomas Kammerlander
 Women's singles:  Evelin Lanthaler
 Men's doubles:  (Patrick Pigneter & Florian Clara)
 February 14 – 16: NTLWC #6 (final) in  Umhausen
 Men's singles:  Patrick Pigneter
 Women's singles:  Evelin Lanthaler
 Men's doubles:  (Pavel Porshnev & Ivan Lazarev)

Speed skating

2018–19 ISU Speed Skating World Cup
 November 16 – 18, 2018: SSWC #1 in  Obihiro
 Men's 500 m winners:  Håvard Holmefjord Lorentzen (#1) /  Pavel Kulizhnikov (#2)
 Women's 500 m winner:  Nao Kodaira (2 times)
 1000 m winners:  Pavel Kulizhnikov (m) /  Vanessa Herzog (f)
 1500 m winners:  Denis Yuskov (m) /  Brittany Bowe (f)
 Men's 5000 m winner:  Patrick Roest
 Women's 3000 m winner:  Esmee Visser
 Men's team pursuit winners:  (Aleksandr Rumyantsev, Danila Semerikov, Sergey Trofimov, & Ruslan Zakharov)
 Women's team pursuit winners:  (Miho Takagi, Nana Takagi, Ayano Sato, & Nene Sakai)
 Men's team sprint winners:  (Michel Mulder, Hein Otterspeer, Kjeld Nuis, & Kai Verbij)
 Women's team sprint winners:  (Yekaterina Shikhova, Olga Fatkulina, Angelina Golikova, & Daria Kachanova)
 Mass Start winners:  Andrea Giovannini (m) /  Nana Takagi (f)
 November 23 – 25, 2018: SSWC #2 in  Tomakomai
 Men's 500 m winner:  Tatsuya Shinhama (2 times)
 Women's 500 m winner:  Nao Kodaira (2 times)
 1000 m winners:  Kjeld Nuis (m) /  Nao Kodaira (f)
 1500 m winners:  Kjeld Nuis (m) /  Ireen Wüst (f)
 Men's 5000 m winner:  Bart Swings
 Women's 3000 m winner:  Isabelle Weidemann
 Men's team pursuit winners:  (Douwe de Vries, Patrick Roest, Marcel Bosker, & Chris Huizinga)
 Women's team pursuit winners:  (Miho Takagi, Nana Takagi, Ayano Sato, & Nene Sakai)
 Men's team sprint winners:  (Alexey Yesin, Artyom Kuznetsov, Ruslan Murashov, & Viktor Mushtakov)
 Women's team sprint winners:  (Janine Smit, Letitia de Jong, Jutta Leerdam, & Femke Beuling)
 Mass Start winners:  Vitaly Mikhailov (m) /  Kim Bo-reum (f)
 December 7 – 9, 2018: SSWC #3 in  Tomaszów Mazowiecki
 Men's 500 m winner:  Pavel Kulizhnikov (2 times)
 Women's 500 m winner:  Vanessa Herzog (2 times)
 1000 m winners:  Pavel Kulizhnikov (m) /  Brittany Bowe (f)
 1500 m winners:  Denis Yuskov (m) /  Miho Takagi (f)
 Men's 10000 m winner:  Marcel Bosker
 Women's 5000 m winner:  Esmee Visser
 Men's team pursuit winners:  (Ryosuke Tsuchiya, Seitaro Ichinohe, Shane Williamson, & Masahito Obayashi)
 Women's team pursuit winners:  (Miho Takagi, Nana Takagi, & Ayano Sato)
 Men's team sprint winners:  (Håvard Holmefjord Lorentzen, Johann Jørgen Sæves, Henrik Fagerli Rukke, & Bjørn Magnussen)
 Women's team sprint winners:  (Miho Takagi, Ayano Sato, Konami Soga, & Kurumi Inagawa)
 December 14 – 16, 2018: SSWC #4 in  Heerenveen
 500 m winners:  Pavel Kulizhnikov (m) /  Nao Kodaira (f)
 1000 m winners:  Kjeld Nuis (m) /  Brittany Bowe (f)
 1500 m winners:  Thomas Krol (m) /  Ireen Wüst (f)
 Men's 5000 m winner:  Danila Semerikov
 Women's 3000 m winner:  Antoinette de Jong
 Mass Start winners:  Um Cheon-ho (m) /  Nana Takagi (f)
 February 1 – 3: SSWC #5 in  Hamar
 Men's 500 m winner:  Pavel Kulizhnikov (2 times)
 Women's 500 m winners:  Nao Kodaira (#1) /  Vanessa Herzog (#2)
 1000 m winners:  Kai Verbij (m) /  Brittany Bowe (f)
 1500 m winners:  Denis Yuskov (m) /  Brittany Bowe (f)
 Men's 5000 m winner:  Sverre Lunde Pedersen
 Women's 3000 m winner:  Martina Sáblíková
 March 9 & 10: SSWC #6 (final) in  Kearns, Utah
 Men's 500 m winners:  Pavel Kulizhnikov (#1) /  Tatsuya Shinhama (#2)
 Women's 500 m winner:  Nao Kodaira (2 times)
 1000 m winners:  Kjeld Nuis (m; World Record) /  Brittany Bowe (f; World Record)
 1500 m winners:  Kjeld Nuis (m; World Record) /  Miho Takagi (f; World Record)
 Men's 5000 m winner:  Patrick Roest
 Women's 3000 m winner:  Martina Sáblíková (World Record)
 Mass Start winners:  Ryosuke Tsuchiya (m) /  Irene Schouten (f)

Other long track speed skating events
 January 11 – 13: 2019 European Speed Skating Championships in  Collalbo
 All-Around 500 m winners:  Haralds Silovs (m) /  Antoinette de Jong (f)
 All-Around 1500 m winners:  Sven Kramer (m) /  Antoinette de Jong (f)
 All-Around 5000 m winners:  Sven Kramer (m) /  Martina Sáblíková (f)
 All-Around Men's 10000 m winner:  Patrick Roest
 All-Around Women's 3000 m winner:  Antoinette de Jong
 Men's Sprint 500 m winner:  Kai Verbij (2 times)
 Men's Sprint 1000 m winners:  Kai Verbij (#1) /  Thomas Krol (#2)
 Women's Sprint 500 m winner:  Vanessa Herzog (2 times)
 Women's Sprint 1000 m winner:  Daria Kachanova (2 times)
 February 7 – 10: 2019 World Single Distance Speed Skating Championships in  Inzell
 500 m winners:  Ruslan Murashov (m) /  Vanessa Herzog (f)
 1000 m winners:  Kai Verbij (m) /  Brittany Bowe (f)
 1500 m winners:  Thomas Krol (m) /  Ireen Wüst (f)
 5000 m winners:  Sverre Lunde Pedersen (m) /  Martina Sáblíková (f)
 Men's 10000 m winner:  Jorrit Bergsma
 Women's 3000 m winner:  Martina Sáblíková
 Men's Team Sprint winners:  (Ronald Mulder, Kjeld Nuis, Kai Verbij, & Thomas Krol)
 Women's Team Sprint winners:  (Janine Smit, Letitia de Jong, Sanneke de Neeling, & Jutta Leerdam)
 Men's Team Pursuit winners:  (Sven Kramer, Douwe de Vries, Marcel Bosker, & Chris Huizinga)
 Women's Team Pursuit winners:  (Miho Takagi, Nana Takagi, Ayano Sato, & Nene Sakai)
 Mass Start winners:  Joey Mantia (m) /  Irene Schouten (f)
 February 23 & 24: 2019 World Sprint Speed Skating Championships in  Heerenveen
 Men's 500 m winners:  Tatsuya Shinhama (#1) /  Pavel Kulizhnikov (#2)
 Women's 500 m winner:  Nao Kodaira (2 times)
 Men's 1000 m winner:  Kjeld Nuis (2 times)
 Women's 1000 m winners:  Brittany Bowe (#1) /  Miho Takagi (#2)
 March 2 & 3: 2019 World Allround Speed Skating Championships in  Calgary
 500 m winners:  Antoine Gélinas-Beaulieu (m) /  Miho Takagi (f)
 1500 m winners:  Sverre Lunde Pedersen (m) /  Miho Takagi (f)
 5000 m winners:  Patrick Roest (m) /  Martina Sáblíková (f)
 Men's 10000 m winner:  Patrick Roest
 Women's 3000 m winner:  Martina Sáblíková (World Record)

2018–19 ISU Short Track Speed Skating World Cup
 November 2 – 4, 2018: STWC #1 in  Calgary
 Men's 500 m winner:  Wu Dajing (2 times)
 Women's 500 m winners:  Natalia Maliszewska (#1) /  Lara van Ruijven (#2)
 1000 m winners:  Shaoang Liu (m) /  Suzanne Schulting (f)
 1500 m winners:  Kazuki Yoshinaga (m) /  Suzanne Schulting (f)
 Men's 5000 m Relay winners:  (Cole William Isaac Krueger, Csaba Burján, Shaoang Liu, & Shaolin Sándor Liu) (World Record)
 Women's 3000 m Relay winners:  (Ekaterina Efremenkova, Ekaterina Konstantinova, Emina Malagich, & Sofia Prosvirnova)
 Mixed Relay winners:  (Fan Kexin, Li Jinyu, Ren Ziwei, & Wu Dajing)
 November 9 – 11, 2018: STWC #2 in  Salt Lake City
 500 m winners:  Wu Dajing (m) /  Natalia Maliszewska (f)
 1000 m #1 winners:  Shaolin Sándor Liu (m) /  Suzanne Schulting (f)
 1000 m #2 winners:  HONG Kyung-hwan (m) /  Alyson Charles (f)
 1500 m winners:  Sjinkie Knegt (m) /  Choi Min-jeong (f)
 Men's 5000 m Relay winners:  (Csaba Burján, Shaoang Liu, Shaolin Sándor Liu, & Alex Varnyu)
 Women's 3000 m Relay winners:  (Choi Ji-hyun, Choi Min-jeong, KIM Ji-yoo, & Noh Ah-reum)
 Mixed Relay winners:  (Sára Bácskai, Petra Jászapáti, Shaoang Liu, & Shaolin Sándor Liu)
 December 7 – 9, 2018: STWC #3 in  Almaty
 500 m winners:  Samuel Girard (m) /  Petra Jászapáti (f)
 1000 m winners:  Shaoang Liu (m) /  Suzanne Schulting (f)
 Men's 1500 m winners:  Lim Hyo-jun (#1) /  KIM Gun-woo (#2)
 Women's 1500 m winners:  KIM Geon-hee (#1) /  Choi Min-jeong (#2)
 Men's 5000 m Relay winners:  (Daan Breeuwsma, Itzhak de Laat, Sjinkie Knegt, & Dennis Visser)
 Women's 3000 m Relay winners:  (Rianne de Vries, Suzanne Schulting, Yara van Kerkhof, & Lara van Ruijven)
 Mixed Relay winners:  (Cedrik Blais, Kim Boutin, Alyson Charles, & Samuel Girard)
 February 1 – 3: STWC #4 in  Dresden
 500 m winners:  Lim Hyo-jun (m) /  Martina Valcepina (f)
 1500 m winners:  KIM Gun-woo (m) /  KIM Ji-yoo (f)
 Men's 1000 m winners:  Hwang Dae-heon (#1) /  PARK Ji-won (#2)
 Women's 1000 m winners:  Sofia Prosvirnova (#1) /  Suzanne Schulting (#2)
 Men's 5000 m Relay winners:  (Charle Cournoyer, Charles Hamelin, Pascal Dion, & Samuel Girard)
 Women's 3000 m Relay winners:  (Ekaterina Efremenkova, Ekaterina Konstantinova, Emina Malagich, & Sofia Prosvirnova)
 Mixed Relay winners:  (Aleksandr Shulginov, Ekaterina Efremenkova, Semion Elistratov, & Sofia Prosvirnova)
 February 8 – 10: STWC #5 (final) in  Turin
 Men's 500 m winners:  Hwang Dae-heon (#1) /  Lim Hyo-jun (#2)
 Women's 500 m winner:  Martina Valcepina (2 times)
 1000 m winners:  Hwang Dae-heon (m) /  Kim Boutin (f)
 1500 m winners:  KIM Gun-woo (m) /  Suzanne Schulting (f)
 Men's 5000 m Relay winners:  (Denis Ayrapetyan, Semion Elistratov, Aleksandr Shulginov, & Pavel Sitnikov)
 Women's 3000 m Relay winners:  (Rianne de Vries, Suzanne Schulting, Yara van Kerkhof, & Lara van Ruijven)
 Mixed Relay winners:  (Ekaterina Efremenkova, Semion Elistratov, Pavel Sitnikov, & Evgeniya Zakharova)

Other short track speed skating events
 January 11 – 13: 2019 European Short Track Speed Skating Championships in  Dordrecht
 Overall Classification winners:  Shaolin Sándor Liu (m) /  Suzanne Schulting (f)
 500 m winners:  Shaoang Liu (m) /  Natalia Maliszewska (f)
 1000 m winners:  Semion Elistratov (m) /  Sofia Prosvirnova (f)
 1500 m winners:  Shaolin Sándor Liu (m) /  Suzanne Schulting (f)
 3000 m SF winners:  Yuri Confortola (m) /  Suzanne Schulting (f)
 Men's 5000 m Relay winners:  (Csaba Burján, Cole William Isaac Krueger, Shaoang Liu, & Shaolin Sándor Liu)
 Women's 3000 m Relay winners:  (Rianne de Vries, Suzanne Schulting, Yara van Kerkhof, & Lara van Ruijven)
 March 8 – 10: 2019 World Short Track Speed Skating Championships in  Sofia
 Overall Classification winners:  Lim Hyo-jun (m) /  Suzanne Schulting (f)
 500 m winners:  Hwang Dae-heon (m) /  Lara van Ruijven (f)
 1000 m winners:  Lim Hyo-jun (m) /  Suzanne Schulting (f)
 1500 m winners:  Lim Hyo-jun (m) /  Choi Min-jeong (f)
 3000 m Superfinal winners:  Lim Hyo-jun (m) /  Suzanne Schulting (f)
 Men's 5000 m Relay winners:  (Hwang Dae-heon, Lee June-seo, Lim Hyo-jun, & PARK Ji-won)
 Women's 3000 m Relay winners:  (Choi Min-jeong, KIM Geon-hee, KIM Ji-yoo, & Shim Suk-hee)

See also
 2019 in skiing
 2019 in sports

References

External links
 Federation of International Bandy
 The International Bobsleigh and Skeleton Federation
 World Curling Federation
 International Skating Union
 International Ice Hockey Federation
 International Luge Federation

Ice sports
Ice sports by year
Ice sports